Youssef Amrani ( - born 23 September 1953, Tangier) is a Moroccan diplomat and politician of the Istiqlal Party. Since October 2021, Amrani has served as the Moroccan ambassador to the European Union. He has previously held positions as Morocco's ambassador to South Africa, Chile, Colombia, and Mexico. He also held the position as the Delegate-Minister for Foreign Affairs and Cooperation in  the cabinet of Abdelilah Benkirane. Before this nomination he worked since 1978 as a civil servant at the Ministry of Foreign Affairs in Rabat. He also served as Consul and Ambassador of Morocco to multiple Spanish-speaking countries and was Secretary General of the Union for the Mediterranean until February 2012.

See also
Cabinet of Morocco

References

External links
Ministry of Foreign Affairs

Living people
Government ministers of Morocco
1953 births
People from Tangier
Moroccan diplomats
Moroccan civil servants
Ambassadors of Morocco to Mexico
Mohammed V University alumni
Istiqlal Party politicians